Giannina Chiantoni (24 June 1881 - 17 May 1972) was an Italian actress. She appeared in more than twelve films from 1910 to 1955.

Selected filmography

References

External links 

1881 births
1972 deaths
Italian film actresses
People from the Province of Matera